Karim Ishan (also Romanized as Karīm Īshān and Karīmishān) is a village in Maraveh Tappeh Rural District, in the Central District of Maraveh Tappeh County, Golestan Province, Iran. At the 2006 census, its population was 689, in 146 families.

References 

Populated places in Maraveh Tappeh County